Joy Street is a 1950 novel by Frances Parkinson Keyes.  Despite only being released on December 1, 1950, it was ranked as the second best-selling novel in the United States for 1950.  Over two million copies were in print by the mid-1950s.  It also topped the New York Times Best Seller list for eight weeks in 1951.

The novel is set in Boston and explores a married couple facing the elitist expectations and norms of Boston society.  Kirkus Reviews described it as a "meticulously caparisoned romantic novel."  William Darby's 1987 review of the popular literature of the 1950s describes the novel as "a characteristic woman's novel", which "unfolds at an excruciating pace."

The novel was also serialized in Good Housekeeping magazine in November and December 1950.

References

1950 American novels
Novels set in Boston
Julian Messner books